Suzhouqiao station is an interchange station under construction on lines 12 and 16 of the Beijing Subway.

History 
Construction of the Line 16 station started on May 18, 2014, and construction of the Line 12 station started on December 28, 2015. The Line 16 section is expected to open in 2020, and the Line 12 station is expected to open in 2023.

Station Layout 
The line 12 station will have an underground island platform. Due to limited space, the Line 16 station utilizes a stacked platform configuration, similar to Qilizhuang station. The upper level platform serves southbound trains, and the lower level platform serves northbound trains.

References 

Beijing Subway stations in Haidian District